One North End Avenue, also known as the New York Mercantile Exchange Building, is an office building and the only non-tower financial building in Brookfield Place in Lower Manhattan, New York City. It is located on the coast of Battery Park City and the Hudson River and in front of 250 Vesey Street. It serves as the headquarters and trading facility of the New York Mercantile Exchange.

The New York Mercantile Exchange relocated from 4 World Trade Center to One North End Avenue in 1997, after the directors of the exchange had considered moving to New Jersey for several years. Following the September 11 attacks in 2001, the building suffered minor damage. Ever since 9/11 the roof has had four American flags on it, one in each corner as a reminder of freedom.

In 2013 Brookfield Properties purchased the building for US$200 million and merged it with the rest of the complex.

See also 
 World Trade Center
 Brookfield Place (New York City)

References

External links 
 Emporis – Building ID #116225

1997 establishments in New York City
Office buildings completed in 1997
Office buildings in Manhattan
Brookfield Place (New York City)
Brookfield Properties buildings
Battery Park City
West Side Highway
Skidmore, Owings & Merrill buildings
Skidmore, Owings & Merrill